The Twang Dynasty is the tenth studio album by the Welsh rock band Man, but the first to be released after their reformation in 1983.
 
Man had recorded an album of new material in Germany, the year they reformed, but fell out with the producer, who was also the album’s promoter, so the album was never issued. The Twang Dynasty was recorded over two weeks in August and two weeks in September 1992, and released on 14 November 1992, sixteen years after their previous studio album.
The album includes the track "Fast and Dangerous" which was used on trailers for Paul Whitehouse’s Fast Show, although the band were not paid for this.

It was the first studio album by Man to feature drummer John "Pugwash" Weathers, formerly of Gentle Giant, although he had appeared on the live album Friday 13th released in 1984.

In 2011 Deke Leonard reused the name for his book The Twang Dynasty (From Memphis to Merthyr; guitarists that rocked the world) (Northdown Publishing).

Track listing 
 "A Feather on the Scales of Justice" (Man) – 7:28
 "Mad on Her" (Man) – 6:59
 "Jumpin' Like a Kangaroo" (Ace) – 4:46
 "The Chimes at Midnight" (Man) – 5:25
 "The Price (Ellis, Man) – 5:57
 "Circumstances" (Leonard, Simmons) – 4:45
 "Women" (Man) – 4:29
 "The Chinese Cut" (Man) – 3:54
 "Out of the Darkness" (Man) – 5:36
 "Fast and Dangerous" (Man) – 5:33
 "The Wings of Mercury" (Man) – 5:24

Personnel 
 Micky Jones – guitar and vocals
 Deke Leonard – guitar and vocals
 Martin Ace – bass and vocals
 John Weathers – drums and vocals

Credits 
 Julie Sheldon – photography
 Phil Smee – cover design

References

External links 
 Man - The Twang Dynasty (1992) album review by Stewart Mason, credits & releases at AllMusic.com
 Man - The Twang Dynasty (1992) album releases & credits at Discogs.com
 Man - The Twang Dynasty (1992) album credits & user reviews at ProgArchives.com
 Man - The Twang Dynasty (1992) album to be listened as stream at Spotify.com

1992 albums
Man (band) albums